Susan Oki Mollway (born November 6, 1950) is a senior United States district judge of the United States District Court for the District of Hawaii and the first East Asian woman ever appointed to a life-time position on the federal bench.

Early life and education
Born in Honolulu, Hawaii, Susan Oki Mollway earned a Bachelor of Arts degree in English literature from the University of Hawaii in 1971 and a Master of Arts degree in English literature from the University of Hawaii in 1973. She graduated cum laude from Harvard Law School with a Juris Doctor in 1981, where she was the Editor in Chief of the Harvard Civil Rights-Civil Liberties Law Review In 2020, Mollway received her Master of Laws in judicial studies from Duke University School of Law.

Personal
She has a son.

Professional career
Mollway taught English and worked at an English-language publisher in Tokyo from 1975-77. After law school, she worked in private legal practice at Cades Schutte Fleming & Wright in Honolulu from 1981 until 1998, when she joined the federal bench. She became a partner at that law firm in 1986. She served as an adjunct instructor at the University of Hawaii William S. Richardson School of Law from 1988-89.

Mollway is the author of The First Fifteen: How Asian Women Became Federal Judges (Rutgers University Press 2021).

Mollway has received a number of awards, including:
 1987 Outstanding Woman Lawyer of the Year Award, Hawaii Women Lawyers Association;
 1998 Trailblazer Award, National Asian Pacific American Bar Association;
 1999 Edith House Lecturer, University of Georgia School of Law;
 2000 Heroes 2000, Harvard Asian American Intercollegiate Conference;
 2004 Outstanding Judicial Achievement Award, Hawaii Women Lawyers;
 2005 Distinguished Service Award, Asian American Justice Center.

Federal judicial service
Mollway was first nominated in December 1995 by President Bill Clinton to serve on the United States District Court for the District of Hawaii to fill the vacancy created by the 1995 death of Judge Harold Michael Fong. After her nomination lapsed without action by the United States Senate, she was renominated on January 7, 1997, to the same seat. She was confirmed by the Senate on June 22, 1998, and received her commission on June 23, 1998. She served as Chief Judge from 2009 to 2015. She assumed senior status on November 6, 2015.

Judge Mollway served on the 9th Circuit Pacific Islands Committee and the 9th Circuit Circuit Conference Executive Committee. Judge Mollway was the chairperson of the 9th Circuit Jury Instructions Committee. Judge Mollway helped to oversee the $121-million renovation of the federal district court facilities in Honolulu and worked on creating a Re-Entry program in the United States District Court, District of Hawaii.  She is a member of the Judicial Conference Committee on Audits and Administrative Office Accountability.

Notable cases

In 2014, Mollway ruled in favor of environmental groups when they sued the County of Maui for discharging groundwater pollution without a permit. The Supreme Court addressed the decision in County of Maui v. Hawaii Wildlife Fund.

See also
List of Asian American jurists
List of first women lawyers and judges in Hawaii
List of first women lawyers and judges in the United States

References

Sources

1950 births
Living people
People from Honolulu
University of Hawaiʻi alumni
Harvard Law School alumni
American women lawyers
American jurists of Japanese descent
Judges of the United States District Court for the District of Hawaii
United States district court judges appointed by Bill Clinton
20th-century American judges
21st-century American judges
20th-century American women judges
21st-century American women judges